My Goddess is a 2018 Taiwanese television series created and produced by iQiyi Taiwan. It stars Jasper Liu, Annie Chen, Lee Chien-na and Jake Hsu as the main cast. Filming began on 21 February 2018 and wrapped up on 4 July 2018.

Synopsis
Yan Dong Ming used to have a flourishing and well-established career in music, and was widely known for his love songs. However, the public has now completely lost interest in him. Desperately trying extend his music career, he ends up in the isolated Geng Hai Village under strange circumstances and meets the "Planting Goddess" Tian Li Yun. Dong Ming, a neat freak and a guy that has "city cancer"—an obsession with city living—can't get used to the natural habitat of the Geng Hai Village. However, under the guidance of Li Yun, he not only falls in love with the self-sufficient village, but also falls in love with the strong and determined Li Yun. When a dangerous crisis threatens the village, Dong Ming faces the choice of standing by or abandoning Li Yun and returning to the city to regain his long-lost music dream.

Cast

Main cast
Jasper Liu as Yan Dong Ming 
Annie Chen as Tian Li Yun
Lee Chien-na as Ping Zhen Xi 
Jake Hsu as Xu Qiang

Supporting cast
Jason Tsou as Ji Zhao Ze
Jeremy Liu as Mi Kang
Hsieh Ying-hsuan as Song Qiao En
Sun Ke Fang as Song Qiao Qi
Suming Rupi as Ma Yao
Jane Liao as Chen Yong Zheng
Tou Chung-hua as Qiu Yuan An

Soundtrack
"Sunburn 曬傷" by Waa Wei
"Far and Gone 遠走" by Kowen Ko
"Your Brave Face 若無其事" by Crispy
"Tin Bian's Little Song (Dong Ming ver.) 田邊的小情歌 東鳴版" by Jasper Liu
"Tian Bian's Little Song (Mi Tang ver.) 田邊的小情歌 米唐版" by Zhu You Cheng
"Cuckoo Song 咕咕歌" by Jasper Liu
"聽見是你" by Lee Chien-na & Jake Hsu
"The Last Sentence I Love You (Zhen Xi ver.) 最後的一句我愛你 真希版" by Lee Chien-na
"The Last Sentence I Love You (Xu Qiang ver.) 最後的一句我愛你 許強版" by Jake Hsu
"The Beginning 最初" by Sun Ke Fang
"旅途" by Lee Chien-na
"Don't Be So Quick to Say You Love Me When You Are in Dulan 別在都蘭的土地上輕易地說著你愛我" by Jasper Liu
"Don't Want to Leave (Jia Jia ver.) 不想離開 家家版" by Jia Jia
"Don't Want to Leave (Dong Ming ver.) 不想離開 東鳴版" by Jasper Liu
"旭" by Jasper Liu
"發洩歌" by Suming Rupi

Broadcast

VIP members would get to watch all episodes. Regular members of Iqiyi China version would only get to watch 2 episodes on each day from Friday to Sunday.

Awards and nominations

References

External links
 My Goddess TTV Official Website 
 My Goddess EBC Official Website 

IQIYI original programming
Taiwan Television original programming
Eastern Television original programming
Taiwanese drama television series
2018 Taiwanese television series debuts
2019 Taiwanese television series endings
Taiwanese romance television series
Television shows about agriculture